Anton Olsson (born 26 January 2003) is a Swedish professional ice hockey defenceman for the Skellefteå AIK of the Swedish Hockey League (SHL). Olsson was drafted in the third round, 72nd overall, by the Nashville Predators in the 2021 NHL Entry Draft.

Career statistics

Regular season and playoffs

International

References

External links
 

2003 births
Living people
Malmö Redhawks players
Nashville Predators draft picks
Skellefteå AIK players
Sportspeople from Helsingborg
Swedish ice hockey defencemen